Katri Ylander is the eponymous debut album from Finnish pop singer Katri Ylander. It was released in 2006 after she became second at Idols in 2005.

Track listing
"Ei Kiinnosta"                        – 3:30                          	
"Vuorollaan" 	          – 3:47                           
"Onko Vielä Aikaa?" 	                          – 3:21                         	  
"Mansikkamäki" 	          – 3:02                         	 
"Hyvästit Ja Huutomerkit" 	          – 3:48                         	 
"En Koskaan" 	          – 3:41                         	  
"Särkymätön Sydän" 	                  – 3:08                         	   
"Tukehdun"                  – 3:34                         	  
"Aamuaurinkoon"               – 4:14                          
"Virheetön" 	                  – 4:00 
"Viereesi Jään"            – 3:27
"Piste" 	          – 3:36
"Pari Kaunista Sanaa" 	          – 3:26

Singles
"Onko Vielä Aikaa?" (June 2006)
"Mansikkamäki" (September 2006)
"Vuorollaan" (December 2006)
"Aamuaurinkoon (April 2007)

2006 debut albums